This is a list of aircraft registration prefixes used by civil aircraft:

Current (post-1928) allocations
The 1928 markings have been amended and added to over the years, with the current markings being:

Post-1928 table notes

Pre-1928 allocations
Note: in the suffix pattern, n represents a number, x represents a letter

Pre-1928 table notes

References

External links
 
 
 Robertson 1967, pp. 21–115

Aircraft markings
Aviation licenses and certifications
Aviation-related lists
Lists of country codes